The 1946 Argentine Film Critics Association Awards ceremony was held in Buenos Aires to honour the best films and contributors to Argentine cinema in 1945.

Awards given
Best Film  (Mejor Película): La dama duende 
Best Director  (Mejor Director): Luis Saslavsky for La dama duende
Best Actor  (Mejor Actor): Narciso Ibáñez Menta for Cuando en el cielo pasen lista
Best Actress  (Mejor Actriz): Mecha Ortiz for El canto del cisne
Best Supporting Actor  (Mejor Actor de Reparto): Froilán Varela for Pampa bárbara 
Best Supporting Actress  (Mejor Actriz de Reparto): Judith Sulian for Se abre el abismo 
Best New Actor  (Revelación masculina): Francisco de Paula for Despertar a la vida 
Best New Actress  (Revelación femenina): Delfy de Ortega for Santa Cándida 
Best Original Screenplay (Mejor Guión Original): Tulio Demicheli for Cuando en el cielo pasen lista
Best Adapted Screenplay (Mejor Guión Adaptado): María Teresa León and Rafael Alberti for  La dama duende
Best Cinematography (Mejor Fotografía): Bob Roberts, Humberto Peruzzi and José María Beltrán for Pampa bárbara
Best Music (Mejor Music): Julián Bautista for La dama duende
Best Foreign Film (Mejor Película Extranjera): Charles Vidor's A Song to Remember (1945)

References

External links
1946 Argentinean Film Critics Association Awards at the Internet Movie Database

Argentine Film Critics Association Awards ceremonies
1946 in Argentina
1945 film awards